Nogizaka46 has released thirty-one singles and six albums, as well as numerous music videos and concert performance videos. Million-selling singles have included "Influencer" and "Synchronicity", each of which won a Japan Record Awards Grand Prix, as well as "Kaerimichi wa Tōmawari Shitaku Naru" and "Sayonara no Imi". Album releases include the studio albums Tōmei na Iro, Sorezore no Isu, Umarete kara Hajimete Mita Yume, and Ima ga Omoide ni Naru made. The group also released a compilation of "under" songs, written for members who perform at concerts but are not part of the main selection group for promoting singles, with the title Boku dake no Kimi: Under Super Best. They released the 10-year-anniversary greatest hits album, titled Time Flies.

Albums

Studio albums

Compilation albums

Singles

As lead artist

Promotional singles

Guest appearances

Other charted songs

Videography

Video albums

Notes

References

Discographies of Japanese artists
Pop music group discographies